The 1915–16 Duquesne Dukes men's basketball team represents Duquesne University during the 1915–16 college men's basketball season. The head coach was Eugene McGuigan coaching the Dukes in his second year. The team finished the season with an overall record of 7–2.

Schedule

|-

References

Duquesne Dukes men's basketball seasons
Duquesne